John Leonard Williams (13 April 1940 – 9 October 2019) was an Australian rules footballer who played with Carlton in the Victorian Football League (VFL). 

Williams's son Mark played for Carlton and Footscray.

References

Sources
 Hillier, K. (2004) Like Father Like Son, Pennon Publishing, Melbourne. .

External links 

John William's profile at Blueseum

1940 births
2019 deaths
Carlton Football Club players
Australian rules footballers from Victoria (Australia)